Blasius may refer to:

 various saints, including Saint Blaise (the French form of Blasius)
 August Wilhelm Heinrich Blasius (1845–1912), German ornithologist
 Blasius of Parma (ca. 1345–1416), natural philosopher, born in Parma
 Frédéric Blasius (1758–1829), French opera composer and conductor
 Gerard Blasius (1627–1682), Dutch anatomist
 Heinrich Wilhelm Blasius (1818–1899), German meteorologist
 Joan Blasius (1639–1672), Dutch playwright, Gerhard's younger brother
 Johann Heinrich Blasius (1809–1870), German zoologist
 Jörg Blasius (born 1957), German sociologist
 Paul Richard Heinrich Blasius (1883–1970), German physicist
 Rudolf Blasius (1842–1907), German physician, bacteriologist, naturalist and ornithologist

See also
 Blaise (disambiguation)
 Saint Blaise (disambiguation)
 Blasius boundary layer

Surnames from given names